Ivana Bašić (born 1986 in Belgrade) is a Serbian artist living and working in New York.

Bašić specializes in sculpture blending various materials, including wax, glass, stainless steel, alabaster and oil paint

, as well as immaterial elements such as torque, breath, weight, rigidity and pressure. Her work addresses the vulnerability and transformation of the human form and its matter 

Bašić’s work has been included in shows curated by Nicolas Bourriaud and at Andrea Rosen Gallery, as well as in Chrissie Iles’ milestone  exhibition Dreamlands: Immersive Cinema and Art, 1905-2016 Her work is in the permanent collection of the Whitney Museum of American Art.

Professional history

Solo shows 

 Ivana Bašić 'Throat wanders down the blade..', Annka Kultys Gallery, London (2016)

Group shows 

 Primary Detectives, Marlborough Contemporary, London (2019) 
 Unquestionable Optimism at the Barn, Johannes Vogt Gallery, East Hampton (2017) 
 Group Show '] [' (organised with Damian Griffiths), Annka Kultys Gallery, London (2017) 
 Group Show 'Zero Zero'  (curated by Molly Soda, Arvida Byström, Ada Rajkovic), Annka Kultys Gallery, London (2016) 
 In the Flesh, Part II: Potential Adaptations curated by Courtney Malick, Nina Johnson, Miami (2016)

Fair booths 

 Michael Valinsky + Gabrielle Jensen at SPRING/BREAK Art Show, 2016, Michael Valinsky + Gabrielle Jensen (2016)

References

External links 

 https://www.artsy.net/artist/ivana-basic

Living people
1986 births
Artists from Belgrade
Serbian women artists
Serbian women painters
Serbian sculptors